is a Japanese video game developer founded by composer Yuzo Koshiro and his mother and sister on April 1, 1990. The company has worked on games such as the 8-bit version of Sonic the Hedgehog, Streets of Rage 2, Beyond Oasis, Shenmue, and Gotta Protectors, among others.

Games
Sonic the Hedgehog – Game Gear, Master System, 1991
Streets of Rage 2 – Sega Genesis, 1992
Actraiser 2 – Super NES, 1993
Streets of Rage 3 – Sega Genesis, 1994
Robotrek – Super NES, 1994
Beyond Oasis – Sega Genesis, 1995
The Legend of Oasis – Sega Saturn, 1996
Vatlva – Sega Saturn, 1996
Columns Arcade Collection – Sega Saturn, 1997
Tamagotchi Pack – Sega Saturn, 1998
Fox Junction – PlayStation, 1998
Animetic Story Game 1: Cardcaptor Sakura – PlayStation, 1999
Car Battler Joe – Game Boy Advance, 2001
Amazing Island – GameCube, 2003
Bobobo-bo Bo-bobo: Shuumare! Taikan Bo-bobo – PlayStation 2, 2004
Bleach: Hanatareshi Yabou – PlayStation 2, 2005
Ueki no Housoku – PlayStation 2, 2006
Fusion Frenzy 2 – Xbox 360, 2006
Katekyoo Hitman Reborn! Dream Hyper Battle! – PlayStation 2, 2007
Katekyoo Hitman Reborn! Battle Arena – PlayStation Portable, 2008
Katekyoo Hitman Reborn! Battle Arena 2 – PlayStation Portable, 2009
Protect Me Knight – Xbox Live, 2010
Puchi Puchi Time – iOS, 2010
Gotta Protectors – Nintendo 3DS, 2014
Amazon's Training Road – Nintendo Entertainment System, 2017
Gotta Protectors: Cart of Darkness – Nintendo Switch, 2019
Royal Anapoko Academy – Nintendo Switch, 2021
Untitled shoot 'em up – Sega Genesis, TBA

References

External links
 

Video game companies of Japan
Video game development companies
Video game companies established in 1990
Japanese companies established in 1990
Hino, Tokyo